General elections were held in the Turks and Caicos Islands on 3 April 1991. The result was a victory for the opposition Progressive National Party (PNP), which won eight of the thirteen seats in the Legislative Council. Following the elections, PNP leader Washington Misick became Chief Minister.

Electoral system
The thirteen members of the Legislative Council were elected from five multi-member constituencies with two or three seats.

Campaign
A total of 26 candidates contested the elections, with the PNP and People's Democratic Movement all running full slates of 13 candidates.

Results

References

Elections in the Turks and Caicos Islands
Turks
1991 in the Turks and Caicos Islands
April 1991 events in North America